Michael DeLorenzo (born October 31, 1959) is an American actor, director, writer, producer, dancer, and musician. He is known for his work in television and film.

Early life
DeLorenzo was raised in The Bronx, New York. His late father, Arthur DeLorenzo, was of Italian descent and his late mother, Carmen DeLorenzo, was from Puerto Rico. DeLorenzo is the second eldest of four children. He has one sister and two brothers.

DeLorenzo first began performing at a young age as a dancer with Tina Ramirez's Ballet Hispanico.  DeLorenzo went on to receive various scholarships from the School of American Ballet, the Joffrey Ballet and the New York School of Ballet. He danced alongside Rudolph Nureyev and the National Ballet of Canada. DeLorenzo performed with Mikhail Baryshnikov and the American Ballet Theatre. He went on to attend the Manhattan-based High School of Performing Arts, made famous by the movie and television series Fame. He danced with Richard Thomas' U.S. Terpsichore Ballet Company, but suffered a serious dance injury forcing him to leave a career in professional ballet.

Career 
DeLorenzo has acted on the stage, in film, and on television. One of DeLorenzo's first acting roles was on stage in the Broadway revival of West Side Story, appearing as one of the members of the Sharks street gang. He then moved on to appear in the 1980 movie Fame and the television show Fame (1982–1987) as a series regular. DeLorenzo appeared in television shows such as Miami Vice and A Different World. and appeared in movies such as Fast Forward (1985) directed by Sidney Poitier. DeLorenzo continued to work on Broadway appearing in the musical Streetheat in 1985. DeLorenzo worked with Michael Jackson and Lionel Richie. He appeared in Jackson’s music video "Beat It", and in Lionel Richie's music video "Running With the Night", "Ballerina Girl", and "Dancing on the Ceiling". He appeared in other music videos and dance performances such as Alexander O'Neal's "Fake". He danced in Chaka Khan's performance of "I Feel for You" at the 1985 Grammy Awards.

DeLorenzo won a Drama-Logue Award for Best Actor in a play at the Mark Taper Forum titled Stand Up Tragedy with a performance portraying five different roles,(1989). For his performance on the stage, he was tapped by the producers of the ABC sitcom Head of the Class to star as Alex Torres, alongside Howard Hesseman joining the last two seasons of the series (1989–1991). In 1994, DeLorenzo played the role of Detective Eddie Torres, the brooding cop with a heart in Dick Wolf's urban police drama  TV series New York Undercover. This was the first time in American television history featuring two people of color (DeLorenzo and fellow actor Malik Yoba) in the starring roles in a prime time drama. For his performance, DeLorenzo was awarded the NCLR American Latino Media Arts (ALMA) Award for Outstanding Actor in a Drama Series in 1996 and 1998. DeLorenzo went on to star in the Showtime drama Resurrection Blvd., playing embittered boxing champion Carlos Santiago. For his performance, DeLorenzo won the Imagen Award for Best Actor and the Vision Award for Best Performance in Drama.

DeLorenzo has appeared in numerous movies including Rob Reiner's drama A Few Good Men (1992) as Pfc. William T. Santiago, as Rafael Cano in Alive (1993), in Mi Familia (1995) as Butch Mejia, The Wall (1998) as Luis. and many others (refer to Filmography below). DeLorenzo continues to act in other notable film and TV shows such as CSI: NY, Numb3rs, Ghost Whisperer and CSI: Miami. DeLorenzo also appeared in various independent feature films. On May 25, 2013, he won the award for Best Supporting Actor at the Los Angeles Movie Awards for his role as Keith Caverns in The Employer.  In 2016, DeLorenzo took on the role of the complex and entangled paraplegic witness Fausto in the CBS police procedural drama Blue Bloods (episode titled Mob Rules, fourth episode of the seventh season). He played José Sarria, a political LGBT activist in the Academy Award-winner Dustin Lance Black's When We Rise (2017), directed by Gus Van Sant.

Director 
Michael DeLorenzo is a director and a member of the Directors Guild of America. While at Showtime, DeLorenzo directed episodes of Resurrection Blvd. He has directed and produced films and short films. He also directed music videos that featured new and upcoming artists.

Musician 
DeLorenzo is also a vocalist, songwriter, composer, and multi-instrumentalist. He plays the guitar, drums and piano. He partnered with an R&B girl group called Teen Dream, under the moniker "Valentino" and released the single "Get Busy" (1987). In the mid-to-late 1990s, during his tenure on New York Undercover, some of his songs appeared on the show—one of them titled, "Don't Let Me Be Lonely Tonight". His songs also have appeared on Showtime's Resurrection Blvd. DeLorenzo co-wrote "Angel", a song for The Sims 2. In 2009, his album Rescue Me was released.

Filmography

Film

Television

Music videos

Video Games

Stage
 "Fool For Love" at the Madrid Theatre   
 "Stand Up Tragedy" at the Mark Taper Forum, Los Angeles, CA (1989)
 "Streetheat" on Broadway, New York City (1985)
 "Tumbleweed" at the Los Angeles Theatre Center, Los Angeles
 "West Side Story" on Broadway, New York City
 "Paperbird" in New York City
 "Aria Dacapa" in New York City

Discography

Rescue Me (2009)

Video game
 The Sims 2: Castaway (2007), "Angel" – co-written by DeLorenzo

TV soundtracks
 New York Undercover TV Soundtrack Album (1998), Track No. 5: "Don’t Let Me Be Lonely Tonight"
 Resurrection Blvd. TV Soundtrack Album (2000), Track No. 12: "On & On"
 In Your Eyes TV Soundtrack Album (2004), "Lay Me Down (Spanish Version)"

See also

References

External links
 Official Website
 

Male actors from New York City
American male film actors
American people of Italian descent
American people of Puerto Rican descent
Hispanic and Latino American male actors
Living people
People from the Bronx
Fiorello H. LaGuardia High School alumni
Dancers from New York (state)
20th-century American dancers
21st-century American dancers
American male dancers
1959 births